Cerbone is an Italian surname. Notable people with the surname include:

Jason Cerbone (born 1977), American actor

See also
Carbone

Italian-language surnames